Samuel Owor Amooti Otada (born 27 October 1971), commonly known as Sam Otada, is a Ugandan businessman and politician. He is the group chairman and group chief executive officer of the Otada Group of Companies, a family-owned business conglomerate. He has been reported to be one of the wealthiest people in Uganda.

Otada previously served as member of Parliament for Kibanda County, Kiryandongo District from 2001 to 2016.

Background and education
Otada was born in Kiryandongo District, Western Region, on 27 October 1971. He attended Makerere University, Uganda's oldest and largest public university, graduating in 1999, with a Bachelor of Commerce degree.

Career
Otada's father, a businessman and entrepreneur, died in 1999 soon after his youngest son finished his undergraduate studies at Makerere. The young man, at age 28 inherited his father's company, then a bus operator with about 30 buses. Under his leadership, the bus company has grown into four different businesses dealing in transportation, civil engineering, construction, waste management, and mobile telephone airtime.

Otada was elected as the member of Parliament for Kibanda County, Kiryandongo District in 2001. He held the seat in 2006 and 2011. For the 2016 general election, the constituency was split into two, with Otada standing for the new constituency of Kibanda County North on an independent ticket. He lost to Taban Idi Amin, but challenged the result through the courts.

Parliamentary responsibilities
During the ninth Parliament (2011–16), Otada served as the Leader of the Independents in the Ugandan parliament. He sat on the following parliamentary committees:

 Equal Opportunities Committee
 Legal and Parliamentary Affairs Committee

See also
 List of wealthiest people in Uganda
 Kiryandongo

References

External links
Website of the Parliament of Uganda

1971 births
Living people
Makerere University alumni
Ugandan businesspeople
People from Kiryandongo District
Members of the Parliament of Uganda
Independent politicians in Uganda
21st-century Ugandan politicians